Scolecocampa is a genus of moths in the family Erebidae. The genus was erected by Achille Guenée in 1852.

Taxonomy
The genus was previously classified in the subfamily Calpinae of the family Noctuidae.

Species
Scolecocampa atriluna J. B. Smith, 1903
Scolecocampa atrosignata Walker, 1858
Scolecocampa liburna Geyer, 1837
Scolecocampa pilosa Schaus, 1914
Scolecocampa porrecta Walker, 1865
Scolecocampa tessellata Hampson, 1926
Scolecocampa tripuncta Schaus, 1901

References

Scolecocampinae
Moth genera